Edith Chapin is an American journalist and the current executive editor of NPR News. She was previously the senior supervising editor of the NPR News Foreign Desk; prior to working at NPR, she spent 25 years at CNN.

Early life

The daughter of a Foreign Service officer, Chapin spent years living in Brazil, Ethiopia, and Guatemala. Chapin attended The Masters School from 1979 to 1983, before obtaining a Bachelor of Journalism degree from Northwestern University's Medill School of Journalism in 1986.

Career

After graduating from Northwestern, Chapin joined CNN. She spent 25 years working at the network, eventually achieving the position of Vice President and Deputy Bureau Chief of CNN's Washington, D.C. bureau.

During her career at CNN, Chapin was present in New York City during the September 11 attacks. She subsequently directed all coverage of the attacks and their aftermath. She contributed to a 2002 book recounting the events of September 11, Covering Catastrophe.

In 2012, she joined NPR as the senior supervising editor of the NPR News Foreign Desk. In 2015, she was promoted to executive editor of NPR.

Awards
Chapin received a Peabody Award for her coverage of Hurricane Katrina in 2005.

References

Year of birth missing (living people)
Living people
NPR
Peabody Award winners
American women journalists
Medill School of Journalism alumni
21st-century American women